Deh-e Azad (also Romanized as Deh-e Āzād; also known as Āzād) is a village in Jahanabad Rural District, in the Central District of Hirmand County, Sistan and Baluchestan Province, Iran. At the 2006 census, its population was 167, in 32 families.

References 

Populated places in Hirmand County